The Trip to Biarritz (French: Le voyage à Biarritz) is a 1963 French-Italian comedy film directed by Gilles Grangier and starring Fernandel, Michel Galabru and Rellys. It is based on the play of the same title by Jean Sarment which was staged at the Comédie-Française in 1936.

It was shot at the Billancourt Studios in Paris and on location in Toulon and London. The sets were designed by the art director Rino Mondellini. It also marked the final film role of the veteran actress Arletty in the role of a hotel proprietor.

Synopsis
Guillaume Dodut is a stationmaster in rural France at a station where trains no longer stop. His dream has always been to holiday in the famous resort town of Biarritz. Meanwhile he gets involved in the romantic life of his son who is studying to be an engineer in London.

Cast
 Fernandel as Guillaume Dodut  
 Michel Galabru as Touffanel  
 Rellys as Louis  
 Catherine Sola as Thérèse  
 Jacques Chabassol as Charles Dodut  
 Hélène Tossy as Madeleine Dodut  
 Anna Massey as Marjorie Robertson  
 Arletty as Fernande 
 Jacques Balutin as Le reporter  
 Paul Bonifas as Bourrély 
 Daniel Ceccaldi as Paul Bonnenfant  
 Albert Dinan as Bastide  
 Jean-Pierre Moulin as Philippe  
 Gaston Rey as Beaucoiran 
 Max de Rieux as Laget 
 Michael Anthony
 Richard Caldicot
 José Casa 
 Josette Chavassieux 
 Jean Daniel
 Germaine Gerlata 
 Alvys Maben 
 Viviane Méry 
 Anthony Stuart 
 Robert Casa as   
 Paul Frankeur as  
 Alix Mahieux as

References

Bibliography 
 Patrice Le Bail & Bruno Le Bail. . 2007.

External links 
 

1963 films
French comedy films
Italian comedy films
1963 comedy films
1960s French-language films
Films directed by Gilles Grangier
Films set in France
Films set in London
Films shot in London
Films shot at Billancourt Studios
Films with screenplays by Michel Audiard
1960s French films
1960s Italian films